Chapdelaine is a surname. Notable people with the surname include:

 Auguste Chapdelaine, French Christian missionary
 Jacques Chapdelaine, Canadian football coach and player
 Michael Chapdelaine, American guitarist
 Rene Chapdelaine (born 1966), Canadian ice hockey player

See also
 Maria Chapdelaine, novel